Gal Mayo (born July 30, 1991) is an Israeli footballer who plays as a centere-back for Israeli National League club Maccabi Petah Tikva.

External links

1991 births
Israeli Jews
Living people
Israeli footballers
Footballers from Rishon LeZion
Hapoel Tel Aviv F.C. players
Sektzia Ness Ziona F.C. players
Hapoel Rishon LeZion F.C. players
Hapoel Ironi Kiryat Shmona F.C. players
Hapoel Petah Tikva F.C. players
Hapoel Nir Ramat HaSharon F.C. players
Hapoel Katamon Jerusalem F.C. players
Hapoel Jerusalem F.C. players
Bnei Yehuda Tel Aviv F.C. players
Maccabi Petah Tikva F.C. players
Israeli Premier League players
Liga Leumit players
Association football central defenders